is an AM radio station of National Radio Network (NRN) in Osaka, Japan, and it is known as "Radio Osaka (ラジオ大阪 Rajio Ōsaka)".  It is also a company of Sankei Shimbun Group in Fujisankei Communications Group.  Radio Osaka started broadcasting on July 1, 1958.

Offices of Radio Osaka
The Headquarters - ORC200, 2-4, Benten Itchome, Minato-ku, Osaka, Osaka Prefecture, Japan
Tokyo office - Musashi 7 Building, 2-4, Ginza Nanachome, Chūō, Tokyo

Changing Frequency of Radio Osaka
1958 - 1971: 1380 kHz, 3 kW
1971 - 1978: 1310 kHz, 50 kW
1978–Present: 1314 kHz, 50 kW

Broadcasting
JOUF
Osaka - 1314 kHz, 50 kW; 91.9 MHz FM
Kyoto - 1314 kHz, 300W
Total:50.3 kW to 55 kW

Time signal
880 Hz (A5)

Supplement
The "OBC Song (OBCソング)" (lyrics by Akiyuki Nosaka (野坂 昭如), music by Taku Izumi (いずみ たく)) is Japan's first commercial broadcasting station's song produced in 1961.
The present headquarters and performance place are located on the fourth floor of the harp hall of the large-sized building "ORC200" near Bentencho Station in Benten Itchome, Minato-ku, Osaka, Japan, and the stereophonic broadcast is performed from the time transferred here.

Programs
Yes!  This is Toshiharu Harada (ほんまもん!原田年晴です)
Beppin Radio (高岡美樹のべっぴんラジオ)
Radio Yoshimoto Genki Super (ラジオよしもとむっちゃ元気スーパー)
5 up Yoshimoto Gachimori (5upよしもと ガチモリ)
OBC Dramatic Keiba (OBCドラマティック競馬)
Sankei Express News (news bulletin)
1314 V-STATION, etc.
Programs from other radio stations via network
A Wake-up Call for You (あなたへモーニングコール, produced by TBS Radio & Communications, Inc. (TBS R&C), from 5 (JST) until 6 (JST) every day)
All Night Nippon (オールナイトニッポン, produced by Nippon Broadcasting System, Inc. (LF), from 25 (JST) until 27 (JST) every Monday to Saturday)

Item
Kansai TV

Other radio stations in Osaka
Asahi Broadcasting Corporation (ABC, 朝日放送)
Mainichi Broadcasting System, Inc. (MBS, 毎日放送)
FM OSAKA (851, FM大阪)
FM802 (802, FM802)
FM COCOLO (COCOLO, 関西インターメディア)

External links
The official website of Radio Osaka (OBC)

Companies based in Osaka Prefecture
Radio stations in Japan
Mass media in Osaka
Fujisankei Communications Group